A second is the base unit of time in the International System of Units (SI).

Second, Seconds or 2nd may also refer to:

Mathematics 
 2 (number), as an ordinal (also written as 2nd or 2d)
 Second of arc, an angular measurement unit,  of a degree
 Seconds (angle), units of angular measurement

Music

Notes and intervals 
 Augmented second, an interval in classical music
 Diminished second,  unison
 Major second, a whole tone
 Minor second, semitone
 Neutral second one-and-a-half semitones

Albums and EPs 
 2nd (The Rasmus EP), 1996
 Second (Baroness EP), 2005
 Second (Raye EP), 2014
 The Second, second studio album by rock band Steppenwolf
 Seconds (The Dogs D'Amour album), released in 2000
 Seconds (Kate Rogers album), released in 2005
 Seconds (Tim Berne album), released in 2007

Songs 
 "Second" (song), a 2021 song by Hyoyeon
 "Second", a 2020 song by Hope D
 "Second", a 2019 song by Erika Costell
 "Second", a song from Sleaford Mods' 2020 compilation album All That Glue
 "Seconds", from The Human League's 1981 album Dare
 "Seconds" (song), from U2's 1983 album War
 "Seconds", from Le Tigre's 2004 album This Island

Film 
 The 2nd, an American 2020 film starring Ryan Phillippe
 Seconds (1966 film), a US thriller directed by John Frankenheimer
 Seconds (2014 film), an Indian Malayalam-language thriller film by Aneesh Upasana
 "Seconds" (The Batman), an episode in the American animated TV series
 "Seconds", an episode of the American TV series Lois & Clark: The New Adventures of Superman

People 
 Albéric Second, a French journalist and writer
 Second-in-command, a deputy commander in British and Commonwealth armies

Science 
 Second of right ascension, in astronomy
 Specific Impulse (rocket engine)

Sports, games, and dueling 
 Second (climbing), the climber who belays the lead climber in lead climbing
 Second dealing, a way of cheating in card games
 Second (chess), assistant to a chess player
 Second (curling), delivers the second set of stones in curling
 Second (duel), the agent of the participant 
 Second, the cornerman in combative sports such as boxing

Other 
 Second (parliamentary procedure), to formally support a motion or resolution
 Factory second, a new product sold for a discount because of minor imperfections
 Second hand or used goods, items that have been used before being resold
 Academic degree, second-class degree, divided into upper-second and lower-second, or 2.1 and 2.2, in the British undergraduate degree classification
 Educational stage in North American elementary schools
 Seconds, an interview magazine published from 1987–2000.
 Seconds (comics), a 2014 graphic novel by Bryan Lee O'Malley.

See also 
 Secondment, a transfer of an employee, usually within an organization
 Segundo (disambiguation)
 SND (disambiguation)
 Secondary (disambiguation)